is a Japanese Buddhist ceremony.

Ceremonies
Gyōdō may refer to three distinct ceremonies: ritual circumambulation of temple buildings or images while chanting sutras; masked processions during memorial services; and, in Pure Land Buddhism, reenactments of the descent of Amida.

Masks

A late-Heian Taishakuten of uncertain provenance was auctioned by Christie's in 2010 for $20,000.

See also
 Gigaku
 Bugaku
 Antiquities trade

References

Japanese culture
Masquerade ceremonies in Asia
Ceremonies in Japan